Mark B. Ingle was an attorney as well as a professional football player in the early 1920s. Ingle played in the National Football League in 1921 for the Evansville Crimson Giants. He was also a co-founder of the team, along with Frank Fausch, and served as the team's vice-president.

Prior to establishing the Crimson Giants, Ingle played for the semi-pro Evansville Ex-Collegians in 1920. He died in either 1949 or 1950 in Oklahoma City, Oklahoma.

References

Notes

1891 births
Players of American football from Oklahoma
Evansville Crimson Giants players
Evansville Ex-Collegians players
1950 deaths